Nemotelus kansensis is a species of soldier fly in the family Stratiomyidae.

Distribution
Canada, United States.

References

Stratiomyidae
Insects described in 1903
Diptera of North America